Muria is a Dravidian language spoken in India. Three varieties have mutual intelligibility. It is sometimes confused with the Madiya language. It is suspected to be mutually unintelligible with northern Gondi dialects.

Phonology 
Muria has 10 vowels and 21 consonants.

References

Agglutinative languages
Dravidian languages
Languages of India